Karantrav (Qarantoraw) is a rural locality (a selo) in Urgalinsky Selsoviet, Belokataysky District, Bashkortostan, Russia. The population was 264 as of 2010. There are 4 streets.

Geography 
Karantrav is located 23 km southeast of Novobelokatay (the district's administrative centre) by road. Urakovo is the nearest rural locality.

References 

Rural localities in Belokataysky District